Thomas James Tune (born February 28, 1939) is an American actor, dancer, singer, theatre director, producer, and choreographer. Over the course of his career, he has won ten Tony Awards, the National Medal of Arts, and a star on the Hollywood Walk of Fame.

Early life
Tune was born in Wichita Falls, Texas, to oil rig worker, horse trainer, and restaurateur Jim Tune and Eva Mae Clark along with his sister, Gracey. He attended Mirabeau B. Lamar High School, Houston and the Methodist-affiliated Lon Morris College in Jacksonville, Texas. He studied dance under Patsy Swayze in Houston. He also studied dance with Kit Andree in Boulder, Colorado. He went on to earn his Bachelor of Fine Arts in Drama from the University of Texas at Austin in 1962 and his Master of Fine Arts in Directing from the University of Houston. Tune later moved to New York to start his career.

Career
He wore horizontally-striped shirts to auditions, dipped extra low when he did pliés and learned to dance upstage ("I'd look shorter that way. It's a law of perspective") to try to overcome it.

In 1965, Tune made his Broadway debut as a performer in the musical Baker Street. His first Broadway directing and choreography credits were for the original production of The Best Little Whorehouse in Texas in 1978. His direction of Nine in 1982, which also won the Tony for Best Musical, garnered him his first Tony for direction of a musical. He has gone on to direct and/or choreograph eight Broadway musicals. He directed a new musical titled Turn of the Century, which premiered at the Goodman Theatre in Chicago on September 19, 2008 and closed on November 2, 2008.

Off-Broadway, Tune has directed The Club and Cloud Nine. Tune toured the United States in the Sherman Brothers musical Busker Alley in 1994–1995, and in the stage adaptation of the film Dr. Dolittle in 2006.

Tune is the only person to win Tony Awards in the same categories (Best Choreography and Best Direction of a Musical) in consecutive years (1990 and 1991), and the first to win in four categories. He has won ten Tony Awards, including a Lifetime Achievement Award in 2015.

On television, Tune was a recurring guest star and assistant choreographer from 1969 to 1970 on The Dean Martin Show and its summer replacement series, Dean Martin Presents The Golddiggers. He also briefly appeared on Mister Rogers' Neighborhood in 1988.

Tune appeared in a 1975 TV special titled Welcome to the "World" along with Lucie Arnaz and Lyle Waggoner to promote the opening of Space Mountain at Walt Disney World. His film credits include Ambrose Kemper in Hello, Dolly! (1969), directed by Gene Kelly and starring Barbra Streisand, The Boy Friend (1971) with Twiggy , and Mimì Bluette... fiore del mio giardino (1976) with Shelley Winters and Monica Vitti. Tune released his first record album, Slow Dancin', in 1997 on the RCA label featuring a collection of his favorite romantic ballads. In 1999, he made his Las Vegas debut as the star of EFX at the MGM Grand Las Vegas.

Tune staged an elaborate musical entitled Paparazzi for the Holland America Line cruise ship the Oosterdam in 2003. He works often with The Manhattan Rhythm Kings, for example touring in a Big Band revue entitled Song and Dance Man and White Tie and Tails (2002).

Tune performed in his musical revue, Steps in Time: A Broadway Biography in Song and Dance, in Boston in April 2008 and continuing in various venues from Bethesda, Maryland in January 2009 to California in February 2009.

The Tommy Tune Awards, presented annually by Theatre Under The Stars (TUTS), honor excellence in high school musical theatre in Houston. The current home of the Tommy Tune Awards is the Hobby Center for the Performing Arts in Houston, Texas.

Tune appeared as Argyle Austero in the revived fourth and fifth seasons of Arrested Development on Netflix. In 2015, he made a return to the New York stage as a featured performer in City Center's staged concert Encores!. He was featured in two numbers in Lady, Be Good!; his first act number was the Gershwin standard "Fascinating Rhythm."

In the eighteenth episode of the sixth season of The Simpsons, "A Star Is Burns", the citizens of Springfield are invited to make their own movies for a town film festival. Mr. Burns’s film, “A Burns for All Seasons”, features Tune’s name in the credits playing the role of Waylon Smithers.

Personal life
Before leaving Texas in the 1960s for a Broadway career in New York, Tune worked with Mary Highsmith (mother of novelist Patricia Highsmith) at the Point Summer Theatre. In a letter to her daughter, Highsmith referred to Tune as her "adopted boy" whom she called "Romano". Tune later praised Highsmith for helping him develop his talents: "She was an opening for me; she opened a little bit of my tight fabric so that I might peer through." When not performing, he used to run an art gallery in Tribeca that featured his own work. As of 2014, it is no longer open.

In 1997, Tune's memoir, Footnotes, was published. In it, he wrote about what drives him as a performer, choreographer, and director and reminisced about his days with Twiggy in My One and Only; as well as meeting and working with his many idols. He further wrote about being openly gay in the world of theater; about losing his partner, choreographer David Steiger Wolfe, to AIDS in 1994, and about the unhappy ending of his relationship with A Chorus Line actor Michel Stuart. He also described a woman whom he did not name but who he said was the "love of [his] life", and some media speculated that the description he gave appeared to fit Twiggy.

As of September 2021, Tommy Tune was the honorary president of the American Guild of Variety Artists, the labor union for non-actor stage performers.

Broadway productions
 Baker Street (1965) (performer)
 A Joyful Noise (1966) (performer)
 How Now, Dow Jones (1967) (performer)
 Seesaw (1973) (performer, associate choreographer)
 The Best Little Whorehouse in Texas (1978) (director, choreographer)
 A Day in Hollywood / A Night in the Ukraine (1980) (director, choreographer)
 Nine (1982) (director)
 My One and Only (1983) (performer, choreographer)
 Stepping Out (1987) (director)
 Grand Hotel (1989) (director, choreographer)
 The Will Rogers Follies (1991) (director, choreographer)
 Tommy Tune Tonite! (1992) (performer)
 Bye Bye Birdie (1992) touring production (performer)
 The Best Little Whorehouse Goes Public (1994) (director, choreographer)
 Grease (1994 revival) (production supervisor)

Awards and nominations

{| class="wikitable"
|-
!Year
!Award 
!Category
!Work
!Result
|-
|1974
|Tony Award
|Best Performance by a Featured Actor in a Musical
|Seesaw
|
|-
|1977
|rowspan=3|Drama Desk Award
|rowspan=2|Outstanding Director of a Musical
|The Club
|
|-
|rowspan=2|1978
|rowspan=4|The Best Little Whorehouse in Texas
|
|-
|Outstanding Choreography
|
|-
|rowspan=2|1979
|rowspan=4|Tony Award
|Best Direction of a Musical
|
|-
|Best Choreography
|
|-
|rowspan=5|1980
|Best Direction of a Musical
|rowspan=5|A Day in Hollywood / A Night in the Ukraine
|
|-
|Best Choreography
|
|-
|Drama Desk Award
|Outstanding Choreography
|
|-
|rowspan=2|Outer Critics Circle Award
|Outstanding Director
|
|-
|Outstanding Choreography
|
|-
|rowspan=4|1982
|rowspan=2|Tony Award
|Best Direction of a Musical
|rowspan=3|Nine
|
|-
|Best Choreography
|
|-
|rowspan=2|Drama Desk Award
|Outstanding Director of a Musical
|
|-
|Outstanding Director of a Play
|Cloud 9
|
|-
|rowspan=4|1983
|rowspan=3|Tony Award
|Best Performance by a Leading Actor in a Musical
|rowspan=4|My One and Only
|
|-
|Best Direction of a Musical
|
|-
|Best Choreography
|
|-
|Drama Desk Award
|Outstanding Choreography
|
|-
|rowspan=5|1990
|rowspan=2|Tony Award
|Best Direction of a Musical
|rowspan=5|Grand Hotel
|
|-
|Best Choreography
|
|-
|rowspan=2|Drama Desk Award
|Outstanding Director of a Musical
|
|-
|Outstanding Choreography
|
|-
|Outer Critics Circle Award
|Outstanding Director
|
|-
|rowspan=3|1991
|rowspan=2|Tony Award
|Best Direction of a Musical
|rowspan=4|The Will Rogers Follies
|
|-
|Best Choreography
|
|-
|Drama Desk Award
|Outstanding Choreography
|
|-
|1992
|Outer Critics Circle Award
|Outstanding Choreography
|
|-
|2003
|Drama Desk Award
|Outstanding Choreography
|Tommy Tune: White Tie and Tails
|
|-
|2015
|Tony Award
||Lifetime Achievement Award
| 
|}

Other recognition
 1994 – Golden Plate Award of the American Academy of Achievement
 2009 – National Museum of Dance's Hall of Fame

In other media
Tune is a common reference in the 2022 Netflix original Murderville
Tune is mentioned in the 71st episode of Seinfeld by Frank Costanza

References

External links
 Tommy Tune official website
 
 
 
 Playbill article, Jan. 15, 1999 "Tommy Tune To Use Tap Skills As Special EFX in Las Vegas; Begins Jan. 15" NOTE: Requires Playbill membership to access.
 Playbill article, Simonson, Robert, April 29, 2008, "Playbill's Brief Encounter with Tommy Tune". Retrieved April 30, 2008

1939 births
Living people
20th-century American male actors
20th-century American singers
21st-century American male actors
21st-century American singers
American choreographers
American gay actors
American male dancers
American male film actors
American male musical theatre actors
American male singers
American musical theatre directors
American tap dancers
Drama Desk Award winners
Lamar High School (Houston, Texas) alumni
LGBT choreographers
LGBT dancers
LGBT people from Texas
American LGBT singers
LGBT theatre directors
Lon Morris College alumni
Male actors from Houston
Moody College of Communication alumni
Musicians from Houston
People from Wichita Falls, Texas
Singers from Texas
Special Tony Award recipients
Tony Award winners
United States National Medal of Arts recipients
University of Houston alumni